Summer Omaha Ultimate League (SOUL) is an amateur ultimate (sport) ("Frisbee") league in Omaha, Nebraska.  Founded in 2006, SOUL was the first ultimate league in the state of Nebraska, with 60 players in the inaugural season  (since that time, Lincoln Ultimate Disc Association (LUDA) has also been founded, in nearby Lincoln, Nebraska).  The league has the stated mission of "working to grow the ultimate community in Omaha".  The summer of 2016 marked the 11th season of SOUL, with league play involving approximately 250 players, on twelve different teams, playing more than 240 games through the entire season.  The league also occasionally uses the moniker Omaha Disc, particularly for internet presence.

Organization
People have thrown flying discs casually and played pick-up ultimate on the fields on the south side of Memorial Park for decades. Pickup games and local club team practices are still held along Dodge Street at the equivalent of 55th-60th Streets. The league was formally founded in 2006 with four teams. Founding members were mostly veteran ultimate players, including Eric Williams who had previously played with Cloud 9 at Rice University. Few of the original 60ish remain - other members who helped get the league going in 2006 that still participate in SOUL and Omaha Disc events include Shawn Campbell, Nick Hildenbrandt, Beau Reed, Josh Sauer, Jeff Gates (also in charge of artwork for each year's disc design), and Tim Hoarty.  Local pickup player Troy Richard served as the inaugural commissioner/webmaster. Lincolnite and LUDA member Collin Baer served as commissioner during the second year, which saw the league grow to 6 teams. Other commissioners have helped propel the league forward, including Rachael Green, Hoarty, Hildenbrandt and the current commissioner, Williams, who has been SOUL's formal leader since the 2011 season. 

The league has steadily grown over the years - though it began with four teams on two fields, SOUL now requires six fields for 12 teams and around 250 players. There are generally 20-40 new players per season, and SOUL is planning for more growth in 2015 at the excellent and hopefully permanent home of the league, NP Dodge Park. In previous years, league games have been played at Memorial Park, Dodge Park, across the river at the Council Bluffs YMCA (after the Missouri River flooding of 2011 made NP Dodge unplayable), and the Storz Rugby Complex in North Omaha.  Pick-up games are still played at Memorial Park and elsewhere, often involving many league players, but are not an official part of the SOUL season. While Memorial is widely recognized as the home of Omaha ultimate, SOUL has simply grown much too large for the space it provides. In 2006, players were divided up by skill level and experience. Now, players are divided up using a draft system - the first week of SOUL serves as a meet'n'greet/pick-up day, followed by the captains meeting to draft. Games are co-ed, although there have traditionally been too few female players for a true 4/3 split, so the offense dictates how many men and women are on the field and the defense must match those numbers.

SOUL has maintained close ties to other area ultimate organizations, including DiscStore.com (founded by local ultimate player Chris Whirrett), LUDA and teams such as UNL Cornfed, UNO  Maverick Ultimate Frisbee, Creighton Ultimate, the Cuddle Raptors (Nebraska's women's club team) and various iterations of Nebraska open club teams over the years such as Bonehorn, Silage, and Rigor Mortis.  Players from SOUL commonly participate in LUDA league play and vice versa, as well as in one-day tournaments such as LollapaLUDA.  While players' average age is early- to mid-twenties, many players are substantially older and the sport is also fast growing among high schoolers in the metro area.

SOUL engages in outreach to encourage and support new players to learn about the sport.   Events have included clinics, such as a Women's Skills Clinic dedicated specifically to encouraging female players.  In 2010, ultimate was officially included as a sport in the Cornhusker State Games for the first time, and SOUL players participated in an ultimate demonstration game. SOUL has also helped in the development of local tournaments, such as Battle in the Bluffs and Great Plains Showdown, by providing merchandise and event insurance.

League Play
The season typically runs from May through early August.  League players pay dues that are relatively cheap ($20-30) compared to many other cities' leagues - this gets them 10-11 weeks of regular season play (20-22 games), an berth in an all-day end-of-season tournament, a SOUL disc, and a legendary tournament party.  Official games are played according to the 11th Edition USA Ultimate rules. Games start at 6PM sharp and each team plays a double-header on Tuesdays, with each round lasting 75 minutes. At 70 minutes, the commissioner's whistle indicates that the game will end in five minutes. If the teams are in the middle of a point when the whistle blows, they finish that point, playing a "universe" or "double-game" point after to decide the winner if they are tied. Regular season record and tiebreakers determine the regular season champion, whose team name and captain are enshrined on the SOUL plaque. At the end of each season, a day-long tournament on Saturday determines a tournament champion, and the league hosts a tournament party that night to celebrate and cap off another successful season. The SOUL party is quasi-famous in its own right, having been hosted at various Omaha establishments such as O'Leaver's on Saddle Creek Road, Elmwood park, several different players' backyards, and more.

In addition to summer league play, SOUL has also organized off-season events, e.g. "Snowltimate." In addition, the fall of 2014 marked the inaugural season of FOUL (Fall Omaha Ultimate League), played indoors with modified speed-point rules and teams of five players (rather than traditional seven-on-seven). Omaha Winter League underwent its inaugural season beginning in February 2015, also at the Omaha Sports Complex on 150th and Giles Road. These efforts, spearheaded by DiscStore.com employee and local ultimate player Dylan Lilla and others involved with Omaha Disc, will continue to help the ultimate community in Omaha and Lincoln develop during the colder months when ultimate activity in Nebraska traditionally decreases or ceases.

References

External links
 Summer Omaha Ultimate League
 SOUL (Facebook)
 @OmahaDisc (Twitter)
 Omaha Disc (Vimeo)
 Lincoln Ultimate Disc Association
 Nebraska Club Ultimate
 Disc Store

Sports competitions in Omaha, Nebraska
Ultimate (sport) competitions